The Argentine Senior Open, or Campeonato Abierto Senior, is a senior men's professional golf tournament held in Argentina that was founded in 1987.

The first winner was 63-year-old Roberto De Vicenzo. The most successful player is Horacio Carbonetti with six victories. However, he failed to win the title at his home club, Rio Cuarto, in 2003, losing out in a play-off with Antonio Ortiz.

Winners

External links
Argentine PGA – official site

Golf tournaments in Argentina
Senior golf tournaments